The Complete Guide to Needlework is the first release by metalcore band Emmure, released in 2006 through This City Is Burning Records and later re-released on September 4, 2007 through Uprising Records. Needlework was produced by Antoine Lussier of Canadian metalcore group Ion Dissonance.

Aside from the versions released through This City Is Burning and Uprising, the EP was also distributed independently with different artwork.

Track listing

Personnel
Emmure
 Frankie Palmeri - vocals
Jesse Ketive - guitar
 Ben Lionetti - guitar
 Mark Davis - bass guitar
 Joe Lionetti - drums 
Production
Produced, engineered and mixed by Antoine Lussier
Mastered by Alan Douches

References

2006 debut EPs
Emmure albums